Trønderen is an islet in Brækmoholmane, part of Thousand Islands, an island group south of Edgeøya. The island is named after Trøndelag, Norway, the birthplace of Sivert Brækmo (1853–1930), a Norwegian sailor and fishermen who regularly visited Svalbard between 1876 and 1895.

References

 Norwegian Polar Institute Place Names of Svalbard Database

Islands of Svalbard